A. W. Marion State Park is a  public recreation area located  northeast of  Circleville, Ohio. The state park encircles  Hargus Lake and offers hiking, fishing, and boating.

Geography
A. W. Marion State Park is in the till plain of eastern Ohio. The till plain is flat or rolling hills that has very fertile soil. It comes from the glaciers that covered America over 10,000 years ago. The Adena settled here 2,000 years ago because of the fertile soil.

History
The Division of Parks and Recreation dammed Hargus Creek with an earthen dam in 1948. The property became a state park under the administration of the Ohio Department of Natural Resources in 1950. It was renamed A. W. Marion State Park in honor of the first director of the Department of Natural Resources, who was a Pickaway County native, in 1962.

Trails
The  Hargus Lake Trail encircles the lake. Mountain biking is allowed on a  multi-use trail.

Wildlife 
Wildlife indigenous to the area includes fox squirrel, ring-neck pheasant, a variety of songbird, a variety of waterfowl including mallard and the occasional loon, great blue heron, black racer snake, red fox, and white-tailed deer.

Boating and fishing
Boats with electric motors and rowing boats are allowed on the  lake. The lake is stocked with largemouth bass, muskellunge, bluegill and channel catfish.

References

External links

A. W. Marion State Park Ohio Department of Natural Resources 
A. W. Marion State Park Map Ohio Department of Natural Resources

State parks of Ohio
Protected areas of Pickaway County, Ohio
Protected areas established in 1948
1948 establishments in Ohio